The Columbia Wetlands is a 15,070 hectare wetland in the Columbia Valley region of southeastern British Columbia, Canada. It was designated a wetland of international importance on World Environment Day, June 5, 2005, and is the thirty-seventh such site in Canada. The wetland satisfies all the inclusion criteria of the Ramsar Convention. It is maintained by the Columbia Wetlands Wildlife Management Area (CWWMA, designated in 1996) and administered by the Canadian Wildlife Service. It is also part of the Living Lakes Network.

It is "one of the longest intact wetlands in North America", is the headwaters for the Columbia River system, and "comprises a regionally unparalleled diversity".

Part of the wetlands is protected by the Columbia Lake Ecological Reserve at the southeast end of the lake.  Columbia Lake Provincial Park is on the northeast end of the lake.

Fauna and flora

The extensive wetland provides habitat for several endangered species, including the peregrine falcon and American badger.

References

External links

 Columbia Wetlands Project

Columbia Valley
Columbia River
Ramsar sites in British Columbia
Wetlands of British Columbia